The Op. 50 mazurkas by Frédéric Chopin are a set of three mazurkas written and published in 1842.

A typical performance of all three mazurkas takes about eleven minutes.

 No. 1 in G major
 No. 2 in A-flat major
 No. 3 in C-sharp minor

References

External links 

Mazurkas by Frédéric Chopin
1842 compositions
Music with dedications

Compositions in G major
Compositions in A-flat major
Compositions in C-sharp minor